The Singles is a singles compilation album by Trance duo Blank & Jones. It was released in 2006.

Track listing
"A Forest (Short Cut)" - 3:34
"Perfect Silence (Short Cut)" - 3:20
"Catch (Radio/Video Mix)" - 3:19
"The Nightfly (Short Cut)" - 3:54
"Cream (Radio Edit)" - 3:17
"Desire (Short Cut)" - 3:24
"Mind Of The Wonderful (Short Cut)" - 4:10
"Somebody (Never Wait)" - 3:52
"DJs, Fans & Freaks (D.F.F.) (Radio Cut)" - 2:44
"Heartbeat (Video Mix)" - 3:28
"Nightclubbing (Wippenberg Remix Short)" - 3:29
"The Hardest Heart (Short Cut)" - 3:34
"Sound Of Machines (Short Cut)" - 3:02
"DJ Culture (New Short Cut)" - 3:11
"Sunrise (Radio Mix)" - 3:37
"After Love (New Short Cut)" - 3:48
"Watching The Waves (Short Cut)" - 3:38
"Unknown Treasure (Radio Cut)" - 3:59
"Beyond Time (Short Cut)" - 3:35
"Flying To The Moon (Radio Mix)" - 3:28
"Revealed (Radio Version)" - 3:47
"The Nightfly (WMC 06 Retouch)" (Bonus) - 3:26

Blank & Jones albums
2006 compilation albums